WLHI (90.3 FM) is a radio station broadcasting a contemporary Christian music format. Licensed to Schnecksville, Pennsylvania, the station serves the Allentown/Bethlehem area of the Lehigh Valley region of eastern Pennsylvania.  The station is currently owned by Four Rivers Community Broadcasting Corporation.

History
On February 8, 2013, it was announced that the then-WXLV was sold by Lehigh Carbon Community College to Four Rivers Community Broadcasting Corporation for $705,000. The transaction was consummated on March 27, 2013. The new owner turned the station into a simulcast of Sellersville-based WBYO, also known as Word FM. WXLV went silent for approximately two weeks at the end of March before the format officially changed.

On April 4, 2013, the station changed its call sign to the current WLHI and began simulcasting Word FM.

Translators

See also
 Media in the Lehigh Valley
 WBYO

References

External links
Word FM official website

LHI
Radio stations established in 1969
1969 establishments in Pennsylvania
LHI